Edward Motale (born 29 July 1966) is a South African former footballer who played at both professional and international levels as a defender. Motale played club football for Dynamos and Orlando Pirates; he also earned seven caps for the South African national side between 1994 and 1995, scoring two goals. He won the 1995 African Champions League with Orlando Pirates. Motale was also part of the squad that won the 1996 African Cup of Nations.

Career statistics

International goals

References

External links

1966 births
Living people
People from Mamelodi
South African soccer players
South Africa international soccer players
1996 African Cup of Nations players
Orlando Pirates F.C. players
Association football defenders
Dynamos F.C. (South Africa) players
Soccer players from Gauteng